Hungeh (also Romanized as Ḩūngeh) is a village in Abanar Rural District, Kalat District, Abdanan County, Ilam Province, Iran. At the 2006 census, its population was 211, in 31 families. The village is populated by Lurs.

References 

Populated places in Abdanan County
Luri settlements in Ilam Province